In Greek mythology, Crinacus (Ancient Greek: Κρινάκου) or Crineus was the second king of Olenus in Achaea after succeeding the eponymous Olenus, son of Zeus. He was another bastard son of Zeus as well, and the father of Macar who became the king of Lesbos. In some accounts, Crinacus' father was called Hyrieus, eponymous king of Hyria in Boeotia.

Note

References 

Diodorus Siculus, The Library of History translated by Charles Henry Oldfather. Twelve volumes. Loeb Classical Library. Cambridge, Massachusetts: Harvard University Press; London: William Heinemann, Ltd. 1989. Vol. 3. Books 4.59–8. Online version at Bill Thayer's Web Site
Diodorus Siculus, Bibliotheca Historica. Vol 1-2. Immanel Bekker. Ludwig Dindorf. Friedrich Vogel. in aedibus B. G. Teubneri. Leipzig. 1888–1890. Greek text available at the Perseus Digital Library

Children of Zeus
Demigods in classical mythology